The Anglican dioceses of Ankole and Kigezi are the Anglican presence in (roughly) the ancient Ankole kingdom and the old Kigezi District; they are part of the Church of Uganda. The remaining dioceses of the church are in the areas of Buganda, of Eastern Uganda, of Northern Uganda, and of Rwenzori.

Diocese of Ankole
The Diocese of Ankole-Kigezi was one of five split from the Diocese of Uganda on 1 July 1960; when the Kigezi diocese was created in 1967, this diocese became Ankole (and Shalita remained in post). When this diocese was again split 10 years later, the remaining part (where Betungura continued as bishop) became known as East Ankole diocese, until 2003, when it resumed the name Diocese of Ankole (upon the erection of North Ankole diocese; Kyamugambi remained in his renamed See). The current mother church is St James's Cathedral, Ruharo (near Mbarara).

Bishops of Ankole
1960–1970 (ret.): Kosiya Shalita (Bishop of Ankole-Kigezi until 1967)
6 December 19701992 (ret.): Amos Betungura (Bishop of East Ankole from 1977)
30 August 19922007 (ret.): Elisha Kyamugambi (Bishop of East Ankole until 2003)
2007: William Magambo, caretaker bishop
2 September 20072010 (ret.): George Tibeesigwa
18 July 2010present: Sheldon Mwesigwa

Diocese of Kigezi
Erected from Ankole—Kigezi in 1967. Around August 1981, Kigezi diocese was split to create North Kigezi diocese; Kivengere remained in post in the southern part.

Bishops of Kigezi
1967–1972: Dick Lyth
197218 May 1988 (d.): Festo Kivengere (in exile 1977–1979)
2 July 19891998 (ret.): William Rukirande
1998–2014: George Katwesigye
2014–2022: George Bagamuhunda
2022-present: Gaddie Akanjuna

Diocese of West Ankole
Founded from the Diocese of Ankole (which became East Ankole) in 1977; See at St Peter's Cathedral, Bweranyangi, Bushenyi District.

Bishops of West Ankole
30 January 19771997: Yoramu Bamunoba
1997–2005: William Magambo
2006October 2016 (ret.): Yonah Katoneene
28 May 2017present:  Johnson Twinomujuni

Diocese of North Kigezi
Split in 1981 from the Diocese of Kigezi; cathedral: Emmanuel Cathedral, Kinyasano, Rukungiri District.

Bishops of North Kigezi
12 April 19811996: Yostus Ruhindi (also Yustasi; previously Bishop of Bunyoro-Kitara)
1996–2004: John Kahigwa
11 January 20042011 (ret.): Edward Muhima
5 June 20112017 (ret.): Patrick Tugume Tusingwire
8 January 2017 15 June 2021: Benon Magezi 
18 June 2021-Present Emeritus Patrick Tugume Tusingwire, as Care-taker Bishop

Diocese of Muhabura
Erected in 1990 from Kigezi diocese.

Bishops of Muhabura
1990–2002: Ernest Shalita
David Sebuhinja was bishop-elect 2001–2006; he did not become Bishop of Muhabura but bishop-assistant for the Provincial Secretariat
26 August 2007present: Cranmer Mugisha

Diocese of Kinkiizi
Divided from the Diocese of North Kigezi, 1995; the mother church is St Peter's Cathedral, Nyakatare.

Bishops of Kinkiizi
7 May 19952010 (ret.): John Ntegyereize (previously Archdeacon of Kinkiizi)
10 October 2010present: Dan Zoreka

Diocese of North Ankole
Erected from East Ankole diocese (which reverted to Ankole), 2003.

Bishops of North Ankole
2003–2015 (ret.): John Muhanguzi
2 August 2015present: Stephen Namanya (previously Archdeacon of Kashwa)

Diocese of South Ankole
Created in 2012 from Ankole and from West Ankole.

Bishops of South Ankole
8 January 2012present: Nathan Ahimbisibwe

Diocese of Northwest Ankole
Founded from the Diocese of Ankole, 2017; cathedral at St Paul's, Ibanda.

Bishops of Northwest Ankole
1 October 2017present: Amos Magezi

See also
 Anglican dioceses of Buganda
 Anglican dioceses of Eastern Uganda
 Anglican dioceses of Northern Uganda
 Anglican dioceses of Rwenzori
 List of Roman Catholic dioceses in Uganda

References

Church of Uganda